Lau Ka Shing (born 13 August 1989 in Hong Kong) is a professional footballer who last played for Happy Valley. He previously played in the Hong Kong First Division League for Fourway Rangers. His position is forward.

References

1989 births
Living people
Hong Kong footballers
Fourway Athletics players
Hong Kong Rangers FC players
Happy Valley AA players
Hong Kong First Division League players
G.D. Lam Pak players
Association football forwards